The Jigüey Dam is an arch-gravity dam on the Nizao River about  west of San Cristóbal in San José de Ocoa Province of the Dominican Republic. The purpose of the dam is to produce hydroelectric power and it supplies the largest hydroelectric power station in the country. 

The power station contains two 49 MW Francis turbine-generators for an installed capacity of 98 MW. The dam was completed and its power station was commissioned 1992. It cost US$500 million to build and funding was provided by the host government.

See also

List of dams and reservoirs in Dominican Republic

References

Dams in the Dominican Republic
Hydroelectric power stations in the Dominican Republic
Dams completed in 1992
Energy infrastructure completed in 1992
San Cristóbal Province
Arch-gravity dams